Dog's Best Friend is a 1997 American comedy fantasy television film directed by Allan A. Goldstein and starring Richard Mulligan. It premiered on The Family Channel on March 23, 1997.

Cast
 Richard Mulligan as Fred
 Shirley Jones as Ethel
 Bobcat Goldthwait
 Adam Zolotin as Wylie
 Adrienne Carter as Cynthia
 James Belushi as Skippy (voice)
 John Ratzenberger as Goat (voice)
 Valerie Harper as Chicken (voice)

References

External links
 

1997 television films
1997 films
1997 comedy films
1997 fantasy films
ABC Family original films
Films directed by Allan A. Goldstein